The 11463 / 11464 Somnath–Jabalpur Junction Express (via Itarsi) is an Express train belonging to Indian Railways – West Central Railway zone that runs between  and  in India.

It operates as train number 11463  from Somnath to Jabalpur Junction and as train number 11464 in the reverse direction, serving the states of Gujarat & Madhya Pradesh.

Coaches

11463/11464 Jabalpur Junction–Somnath Express presently has 1 First AC coach, 2 AC 2 tier, 4 AC 3 tier, 09 Sleeper class, 4 General Unreserved & 2 SLR (Seating cum Luggage Rake) coaches. It does not have a pantry car.

As is customary with most train services in India, coach composition may be amended at the discretion of Indian Railways depending on demand.

Service

The 11464 Jabalpur Junction–Somnath Express via Itarsi Junction covers the distance of 1402 kilometres in 27 hours 55 mins (50 km/hr) & in 27 hours 35 mins as 11463 Somnath–Jabalpur Junction Express (51 km/hr).

As the average speed of the train is below 55 km/hr, as per Indian Railways rules, its fare does not include a Superfast surcharge.

Routeing

Traction

Timings

 11463 Somnath–Jabalpur Junction Express leaves Somnath every day except Monday & Saturday at 09:55 hrs IST and reaches Jabalpur Junction at 13:25 hrs IST the next day.
 11464 Jabalpur Junction–Somnath Express leaves Jabalpur Junction every day except Monday & Saturday at 14:00 hrs IST and reaches Somnath at 17:55 hrs IST the next day.

Direction reversal
The train reverses its direction once at:
 .

Rake sharing
The train shares its rake with; 
 11465/11466 Somnath–Jabalpur Express (via Bina),
 22191/22192 Jabalpur–Indore Overnight Express.

See also
 Somnath–Jabalpur Express (via Bina)
 Jabalpur–Indore Overnight Express
 Somnath railway station
 Jabalpur Junction railway station

References

External links

Transport in Jabalpur
Transport in Veraval
Express trains in India
Rail transport in Madhya Pradesh
Rail transport in Gujarat